Fabio Turchi (born 24 July 1993) is an Italian professional boxer who held the WBC International cruiserweight title in 2019. As an amateur he won a gold medal at the 2013 Mediterranean Games, silver at the 2010 Youth Olympics and 2014 World Military Championships, and bronze at the 2010 Youth World Championships.

Professional boxing career
Turchi made his professional debut against Adis Dadovic on 31 October 2015. He won the fight by a first-round technical knockout. Turchi amassed an 8–0 record during the next year, with six victories coming by way of stoppage, before being booked to face Maurizio Lovaglio for the vacant Italian cruiserweight title on 23 December 2016. He captured his first professional title with a sixth-round technical knockout of Lovaglio.

Turchi had two more fights before fighting for his first regional title. On 11 March 2017, he beat Isossa Mondo on points and on 2 June 2017, he beat Tamas Kozma by a fourth-round technical knockout. Following these two victories, Turchi was scheduled to face Cesar David Crenz for the vacant WBC International Silver cruiserweight title on 15 July 2017. He won the fight by a fourth-round technical knockout.

Turchi made his United States debut against Demetrius Banks on 1 December 2017. He won the fight by a fourth-round stoppage, as Banks retired at the end of the round. Turchi made his first WBC International Silver title defense against Dario German Balmaceda on 2 February 2018. He won the fight by a first-round technical knockout, stopping Balmaceda at the very last second of the opening round. Turchi made his second title defense against Tony Conquest on 30 November 2018. He won the fight by a seventh-round knockout.

Turchi was expected to face Sami Enbom for the vacant WBC International cruiserweight title on 26 April 2019. On 22 April, it was revealed that Enbom had withdrawn from the bout due to an undisclosed reason, and was replaced by Sami Enbom. Turchi won the fight by a first-round knockout, stopping the Finnish boxer at the 1:16 minute mark of the opening round. Turchi made his first WBC International title defense against Tommy McCarthy on 11 October 2019. McCarthy won the fight by split decision. Two judges scored the fight 115–113 and 116–112 in favor of McCarthy, while the third judge scored the bout 116–112 for Turchi.

Turchi was booked to face Nikolajs Grisunins for the vacant IBF International Cruiserweight title on 23 October 2020. Turchi successfully rebounded from his first professional loss, as he won the fight by unanimous decision, with scores of 100–90, 99–91 and 98–92. Turchi next challenged the EBU cruiserweight champion Dylan Bregeon on 16 April 2019, in the main event of a DAZN broadcast card. He won the fight by unanimous decision, with all three judges scoring the fight 115–113 in his favor.

Professional boxing record

References

External links

1993 births
Living people
Italian male boxers
Heavyweight boxers
Cruiserweight boxers
Southpaw boxers
Sportspeople from Florence
Boxers at the 2014 Summer Youth Olympics
Competitors at the 2013 Mediterranean Games
Mediterranean Games gold medalists for Italy
Boxers at the 2010 Summer Youth Olympics
Mediterranean Games medalists in boxing